Anne Ragna Berge (born 31 January 1966) is a Norwegian alpine skier. She was born in Sandvika, and represented the club Stabæk IF. She competed at the 1992 Winter Olympics in Albertville.

References

External links

1966 births
Living people
Sportspeople from Bærum
Norwegian female alpine skiers
Olympic alpine skiers of Norway
Alpine skiers at the 1992 Winter Olympics